Cobweb art is a form of art which creates different pictures from cobwebs. The main material used is cobweb, which the artist collects and processes. Andranik Avetisyan (Ado) has not created canvas from cobweb, but is the first artist to create pictures from cobweb.
Avetisyan's works are made of real cobweb. Avetisyan was awarded the "New Talent and Creative Thought" prize at the Cannes "World's Artists" International Exhibition of Modern Art, which was held in 2017.

Cobweb painting

Canvases made from cobwebs have been painted on for many years.

References

Visual arts media